The pound was the currency of Nigeria between 1907 and 1973.  Until 1958, Nigeria used the British West African pound, after which it issued its own currency. The pound was subdivided into 20 shillings, each of 12 pence.  The Nigerian pound (which was at parity with the pound sterling with free convertibility) was replaced with the introduction in 1973 of the decimal naira at a rate of £1 = ₦2.  This made Nigeria the last country to abandon the £sd currency system.

Coins

The d and 1d coins were holed and struck in bronze. The 3d coin, minted in nickel-brass, was a smaller version of the distinctive twelve-sided threepenny bits that were used in the UK, Fiji and Jersey. The higher denominations were struck in cupro-nickel.

Banknotes

In 1918, emergency issues were made by the government in denominations of 1/–, 10/– and 20/–. In 1959, the Central Bank of Nigeria introduced notes in denominations of 5/– and 10/–, £1 and £5. Three series of notes were issued, in 1958, 1967 and 1968.

See also

Economy of Nigeria

Notes

References

Currencies of the British Empire
Currencies of the Commonwealth of Nations
Currencies of Nigeria
Modern obsolete currencies
Economic history of Nigeria
Pound (currency)
1907 establishments in the British Empire
1973 disestablishments in Africa
Currencies introduced in 1907